The Russell House is a historic house in Andover, Massachusetts.

The weatherboarded Federal-style home was built in 1805. It was added to the National Register of Historic Places in 1982. The house and farm were owned by Deacon Joseph Russell, a descendant of Robert Russell, a Scotsman, who emigrated to Massachusetts in the seventeenth century and was the first person buried in Andover's newly created South Parish 'Burying-Yard,' as it was called, in 1710 at age 80. Russell's descendants intermarried with the Holt, Abbott, Marshall, Chandler, Dane and other early Andover settler families. The 'Scotland District' name for that section of Andover derives from Robert Russell's Scottish birthplace, and his subsequent name for his landholding which he called 'Scotland farm.'

See also
National Register of Historic Places listings in Andover, Massachusetts
National Register of Historic Places listings in Essex County, Massachusetts

References

Sources
 Burke's American Families with British Ancestry: The Lineages of 1,600 Families of British Origin Now Resident in the United States of America, Bernard Burke, Republished by Genealogical Publishing Company, 1975,

External links
 Deacon Joseph Russell House and Farm, 28 Rocky Hill Road, Andover, Massachusetts, Andover Historic Preservation

Houses completed in 1805
Houses in Andover, Massachusetts
Scottish-American culture in Massachusetts
National Register of Historic Places in Andover, Massachusetts
1805 establishments in Massachusetts
Houses on the National Register of Historic Places in Essex County, Massachusetts